Seeiso, full name Simon Seeiso Griffith (1905 – 26 December 1940) was the paramount chief of Basutoland from 23 June 1939 until his death. He was the father of king Moshoeshoe II of Lesotho and the paternal grandfather of king Letsie III of Lesotho.

References 

1905 births
1940 deaths
Kings of Lesotho
House of Moshesh
Basutoland people